Taxa or Taxon may refer to:
 Taxa as the plural of taxon, a concept in biological classification
 Taxon description, a formal description of one newly discovered species
 Taxa K 1640 efterlyses, a 1956 Danish drama film
 Taxa (TV series), a Danish television series
 Taxa Innocentiana, a 1678 decree by Pope Innocent XI regulating the fees that episcopal chancery offices might demand or accept for various acts, instruments and writings

See also
 
 
 
 
 Taxonomy (biology)
 Taxonomic diversity
 Taxonomic rank
 Taxonomic relict